Vanuatu first competed at the Summer Paralympic Games in 2000, sending two athletes to compete in javelin events. The country was absent from the 2004 Games, returning to the Paralympics in 2008. Vanuatu has never taken part in the Winter Paralympic Games, and no ni-Vanuatu athlete has ever won a Paralympic medal.

Full results for Vanuatu at the Paralympics

See also

 Vanuatu at the Olympics

References